Sian, Seyan or Siyan may refer to:
 Sian, Jarqavieh Sofla, Isfahan County, Isfahan Province
 Sian, Jolgeh, Isfahan County, Isfahan Province
 Sian-e Olya, Markazi Province
 Sian-e Sofla, Markazi Province